Zambia Union of Financial Institutions and Allied Workers (ZUFIAW) is the dominant financial trade union in Zambia.

The union was founded on 17 November 1961 as Rhodesian Society of Bank Officials. Its name was changed to Zambia Union of Bank Officials on 23 November 1970, then Zambia Union of Financial Institutions in 1978. It was given its current name in 1984.ZUFIAW Last had a countrywide strike in 1985.

Sector representation: banks, insurance, building societies, micro-finance, pensions, all financial related  and allied institutions.

It currently has 26   member unionised institutions. Joyce Nonde-Simukoko was General Secretary of ZUFIAW from 1998 to 2013. She was later appointed as Cabinet Minister and took the office of the Minister of Labour and Social Security.  In 2021, the General Secretary elected at the 13th Quadrennial Conference was Kasapo Sundrea Kabende, and the President is Alfred Chifota.

The ZUFIAW is affiliated to the UNI Global Union UNI Global Union and Federation of Free Trade Unions of Zambia.

Presidents
1986: Peter Mulenga
1995: Bright Nyirenda
1998: Siisi Mutukwa
2002: Cephas Mukuka
2013: Ackim Mweemba
2021: Alfred Chifota

General Secretaries
1971: C Chibesakunda
1994: G P Aliklipo
1998: Joyce Nonde-Simukoko
2013: Chingati Msiska
2021: Kasapo Sundrea Kabende

References

External links
 www.zufiaw.org
 

Finance sector trade unions
Trade unions established in 1961
Trade unions in Zambia